"Levikset repee" is a song by Finnish rapper Sini Sabotage featuring VilleGalle from her debut album 22 m². The song was released as a single on 19 April 2013, and in May it peaked at number one on the Finnish Singles Chart.

Chart performance

References

Finnish songs
2013 singles
Number-one singles in Finland
Sini Sabotage songs
2013 songs
Warner Music Group singles